The Alachua Formation is a Miocene geologic formation in Florida. The claystones, sandstones and phosphorites of the formation preserve many fossils of mammals, birds, reptiles and fish, among others megalodon.

Fossil content 
The formation has provided the following fossils.

Mammals 
Rodents

 Harrymys magnus
 Nototamias hulberti
 Petauristodon pattersoni
 Proheteromys floridanus
 cf. Miospermophilus sp.
 Mylagaulus kinseyi
 cf. Texomys sp.
 Lagomorpha indet.
 Mylagaulidae indet.

Carnivora

 Amphicyon longiramus
 Borophagus orc
 B. pugnator
 Cynelos caroniavorus
 Enhydritherium terraenovae
 Epicyon haydeni
 E. saevus
 Eucyon davisi
 Euoplocyon spissidens
 Leptarctus ancipidens
 Metatomarctus canavus
 Oligobunis floridanus
 Osbornodon iamonensis
 Phoberocyon johnhenryi
 Zodiolestes freundi
 Borophagus sp.
 Phlaocyon sp.
 Sthenictis sp.
 Felidae indet.
 Mustelinae indet.

Ground sloths
 Pliometanastes protistus
 Thinobadistes segnis

Gomphotheres
 Amebelodon (Konobelodon) britti
 Amebelodon sp.

Artiodactyls

 Aepycamelus major
 Diabolocornis simonsi
 Floridachoerus olseni
 Floridameryx floridanus
 Floridatragulus dolichanthereus
 Hemiauchenia minima
 Machaeromeryx gilchristensis
 Nothokemas floridanus
 Parablastomeryx floridanus
 Pediomeryx hemphillensis
 Prosynthetoceras texanus
 Synthetoceras australis
 S. cf. tricornatus
 Yumaceras hamiltoni
 Aepycamelus sp.
 Hemiauchenia sp.
 Merycoidodon sp.
 Antilocapridae indet.
 Camelidae indet.
 Ruminantia indet.
 Tayassuidae indet.
 Tayassuinae indet.

Soricomorpha

 Karstala silva
 Miomyotis floridanus
 Primonatalus prattae
 Suaptenos whitei
 Limnoecus sp.
 Chiroptera indet.

Perissodactyls

 Anchitherium clarencei
 Aphelops malacorhinus
 A. mutilus
 Archaeohippus blackbergi
 Calippus elachistus
 Calippus hondurensis
 Calippus maccartyi
 Cormohipparion emsliei
 C. ingenuum
 C. plicatile
 Floridaceras whitei
 Menoceras barbouri
 Nannippus aztecus
 N. morgani
 N. westoni
 Neohipparion trampasense
 Parahippus leonensis
 Protohippus gidleyi
 Pseudhipparion skinneri
 Tapirus webbi
 Teleoceras proterum
 Hipparion cf. tehonense
 cf. Astrohippus sp.
 Dinohippus sp.

Sirenians
 Metaxytherium cf. floridanum

Lipotyphla
 Talpidae indet.

Theriiformes
 Vespertilionidae indet.

Birds 

 Anhinga grandis
 A. subvolans
 Boreortalis laesslei
 Ereunetes rayi
 Jacana farrandi
 Nycticorax fidens
 Phalacrocorax wetmorei
 Promilio brodkorbi
 P. epileus
 P. floridanus
 Rhegminornis calobates
 Thomasococcyx philohippus
 Anatidae indet.
 Cuculidae indet.

Reptiles 
Turtles

 Floridemys nana
 Hesperotestudo turgida
 Macrochelys auffenbergi
 Pseudemys caelata
 P. carri
 P. williamsi
 Testudo tedwhitei
 Apalone sp.
 Deirochelys sp.
 Pseudemys sp.
 Trachemys sp.

Crocodiles

 Alligator mississippiensis
 A. olseni
 Thecachampsa sericodon
 Alligator sp.

Snakes
 Anilioides minuatus
 Boa constrictor
 Calamagras floridanus
 Ogmophis pauperrimus
 Paraoxybelis floridanus
 Pseudocemophora antiqua
 Pterygoboa sp.

Lizards
 Peltosaurus floridanus
 Gekkonidae indet.
 Scolecophidia indet.

Amphibians 
Anurans

 Bufo praevius
 Hyla goini
 Proacris mintoni
 Scaphiopus (Scaphiopus) holbrooki
 Microhyla sp.
 Rana sp.

Salamanders
 Siren hesterna

Fish 
Sharks

 megalodon
 Carcharhinus brevipinna
 Carcharhinus limbatus
 Carcharhinus leucas
 Carcharhinus plumbeus
 Carcharias taurus
 Carcharodon hastalis
 Galeocerdo aduncus
 Negaprion brevirostris
 Physogaleus contortus
 Rhizoprionodon terranovae
 Carcharhinus sp.
 Negaprion sp.

Rays
 Pristis sp.

Others
 Hemipristis serra
 Lepisosteus sp.

See also 

 List of fossiliferous stratigraphic units in Florida
 Alajuela Formation
 Chagres Formation
 Goliad Formation
 Shoal River Formation
 Tuira Formation

References

Bibliograyhy 

 C. Pimiento. 2014. Carcharocles megalodon unpublished collections from Natural History Museums around the world
 R. C. Hulbert, Jr. 1988. Calippus and Protohippus (Mammalia, Perissodactyla, Equidae) from the Miocene (Barstovian-early Hemphillian) of the Gulf Coastal Plain. Bulletin of the Florida State Museum, Biological Sciences 32(3):221-340
 S. D. Webb, B. J. MacFadden, and J. A. Baskin. 1981. Geology and paleontology of the Love Bone Bed from the Late Miocene of Florida. American Journal of Science 281:513-544
 S. E. Hirschfeld and S. D. Webb. 1968. Plio-Pleistocene Megalonychid Sloths of North America. Bulletin of the Florida State Museum 12(5)
 S. D. Webb. 1966. A Relict Species of the Burrowing Rodent, Mylagaulus, from the Pliocene of Florida. Journal of Mammalogy 47
 W. Auffenberg. 1963. Fossil testudinine turtles of Florida: genera Geochelone and Floridemys. Bulletin of the Florida State Museum, Biological Sciences 7(2):53-97
 T. E. White. 1942. The Lower Miocene mammal fauna of Florida. Bulletin of the Museum of Comparative Zoology 92(1):1-49
 G. G. Simpson. 1930. Tertiary Land Mammals of Florida. Bulletin of the American Museum of Natural History 59(3):1-64

Geologic formations of Florida
Miocene Series of North America
Neogene Florida
Barstovian
Clarendonian
Hemingfordian
Hemphillian
Shale formations of the United States
Sandstone formations of the United States
Phosphorite formations
Shallow marine deposits
Paleontology in Florida